This is a List of clubs in the Oberliga Baden-Württemberg, including all clubs and their final placings from the inaugural season 1978–79 to the current one. The league, is the highest football league in the state of Baden-Württemberg. It is one of fourteen Oberligas in German football, the fifth tier of the German football league system. Until the introduction of the 3. Liga in 2008 it was the fourth tier of the league system, until the introduction of the Regionalligas in 1994 the third tier.

Overview
The league was formed in 1978 to replace the four regional amateur leagues that existed in its place until then as the third tier in Baden-Württemberg. Originally it carried the name Amateur-Oberliga Baden-Württemberg. In 1994, when the Regionalliga Süd was formed, the league changed its official name once more, now to Oberliga Baden-Württemberg, and became a tier four league. In 2012, the Regionalliga Süd was replaced by the Regionalliga Südwest but little else changed for the Oberliga otherwise.

League timeline
The league went through the following timeline of name changes, format and position in the league system:

List of clubs
This is a complete list of clubs, as of the 2022–23 season, sorted by the last season a club played in the league:

Key

Notes
1 In 1995 VfR Pforzheim and GSV Maichingen withdrew their teams from the league.
2 In 1998 FV 09 Weinheim joined TSG Weinheim to form TSG 62/09 Weinheim.
3 In 2001 SSV Ulm 1846 withdrew from the 2nd Bundesliga to the Verbandsliga for financial reasons. In 2014 Ulm declared insolvency and was relegated from the Regionalliga.
4 In 2002 VfR Mannheim withdrew from the Regionalliga to the Landesliga.
5 In 2003 SSV Reutlingen and SV Waldhof Mannheim were relegated to the Oberliga for financial reasons. SV Waldhof Mannheim II was relegated because the first team was dropped to the Oberliga.
6 In 2010 1. FC Pforzheim and VfR Pforzheim merged to form 1. CfR Pforzheim.
7 In 2011 VfL Kirchheim/Teck voluntarily withdrew from the league.
8 In 2003 VfR Heilbronn merged with SpVgg Heilbronn to form FC Heilbronn.
9 In 2007 the football department of SB Heidenheim left the club to form 1. FC Heidenheim 1846.
10 In 2012 FV Illertissen left the Baden-Württemberg football league system to join the Bavarian one.
11 In 2014 TSV Grunbach and 1. FC Heidenheim II withdrew from the league.
12 In 2015 VfR Aalen II withdrew from the league.
13 In 2017 Stuttgarter Kickers II withdrew from the league.
14 In 2018 Karlsruher FC II withdrew from the league.
15 In 2021 SV Sandhausen II withdrew from the league.

League placings
The complete list of clubs in the league and their league placings.

Amateur-Oberliga Baden-Württemberg
The complete list of clubs and placings in the league while operating as the tier three Amateur-Oberliga Baden-Württemberg from 1978 to 1994:

Oberliga Baden-Württemberg

1994–2012
The complete list of clubs and placings in the league while operating as the tier four (1994–2008) and five (2008–2012) Oberliga Baden-Württemberg and feeding the Regionalliga Süd:

2012–present
The complete list of clubs and placings in the league while operating as the tier five Oberliga Baden-Württemberg and feeding the Regionalliga Südwest (2012–present):

Key

References

External links 
  Das deutsche Fussball Archiv Historic German league tables
  Weltfussball.de Round-by-round results and tables of the Oberliga Baden-Württemberg from 1994 onwards
  kicker Online: Oberliga Baden-Württemberg

Oberliga Baden-Württemberg
Football competitions in Baden-Württemberg
Baden-Wurttemberg